Alamance Regional Medical Center is a private, not-for-profit 238 bed hospital located in Burlington, North Carolina.  The hospital opened in 1995 on Huffman Mill Road.  Alamance Regional provides healthcare to residents of Alamance County, North Carolina and surrounding areas.  Alamance Regional joined the Cone Health network in May 2013.

History 
Alamance Regional Medical Center roots began in 1916 with the opening of Rainey Hospital at 1308 Rainey Street in East Burlington.  This hospital was renamed  Alamance General Hospital, Inc., in 1937.  Rainey Hospital was the primary hospital in the area until Alamance County Hospital opened at 319 North Graham-Hopedale Road.  Rainey Hospital closed in 1961 when a replacement facility was built as Alamance Memorial Hospital.  The former hospital building is still used by private businesses.

Alamance County hospital opened in 1951.  This hospital was operated by Alamance County until turning private in the 1980s.  The former hospital building is currently owned and operated by Alamance County government as the Human Services Center.

Alamance Memorial Hospital opened as a 100-bed facility off of Edgewood Avenue in Burlington as a replacement for Rainey Hospital.  This facility was demolished and replaced with a retirement facility after the merger of the two county hospitals into Alamance Regional Medical Center.

In 1986, the two hospital boards merged the hospitals by resolution, making them subsidiaries of Alamance Health Services. Alamance Regional Medical Center was constructed as a replacement for the two older hospitals and opened in 1995.  In 2013, Alamance Regional Medical Center merged with Cone Health and became Cone Health Alamance Regional Medical Center.

Awards 
In 2012 and 2013, Alamance Regional Medical Center received the Most Wired Award from the American Hospital Association for its use of information technology in patient care.

References

External links 
 Cone Health Alamance Regional Medical Center website

Hospital buildings completed in 1995
Cone Health
Hospitals in Greensboro, North Carolina
Cone family